Richard Beauchamp (April 8, 1901 – June 30, 1975) was an American diver. He competed in the men's plain high diving event at the 1920 Summer Olympics.

References

1901 births
1975 deaths
American male divers
Olympic divers of the United States
Divers at the 1920 Summer Olympics
Sportspeople from Leavenworth, Kansas